The Solicitor General of Ohio, Ohio Solicitor General, State Solicitor of Ohio, or Ohio State Solicitor is the top appellate solicitor  or lawyer for the U.S. State of Ohio.  It  is an appointed position in the Office of the Ohio Attorney General that focuses on the office's  major appellate cases.  The majority of the cases handled by the Solicitor are argued in the United States Supreme Court or the Supreme Court of Ohio.  However some cases within the Solicitor's responsibilities are under the jurisdiction of the  United States Court of Appeals for the 6th Circuit and the state appellate courts. The Solicitor represents the Attorney General of Ohio before the Supreme Court of Ohio and other appellate courts, as needed.  He (and his assistants) write most of the amicus briefs filed by the Ohio attorney general’s office.

History 

The position was created in 1993 by Ohio Attorney General Lee Fisher and was first filled by Richard Cordray.  It is a similar position to Solicitors in many states and is modeled after the United States Solicitor General. By 2003, twenty-nine states had Solicitors General, although only eight had them fifteen years earlier. Initially, the Solicitor had no support staff except a secretary. In 1999, two "associate solicitors" began to work with the state solicitor in the attorney general’s office with an exclusive focus on appellate litigation.  In addition to the solicitor and his assistants, The Simon Karas Fellowship program which was instituted in 2000, supports one lawyer each year to focus on appellate litigation soon after completion of law school or a judicial clerkship. It is not a statutory position in Ohio, but since April 2002 the Supreme Court of Ohio has recognized it in its rules.  In the first ten years of the position, three former United States Supreme Court Clerks held the appointment.

The Solicitor does not always argue constitutional law. Cordray, who served under then-Attorney General Lee Fisher until Betty Montgomery won the position in 1994, argued a technical criminal case on Halloween day in 1993 when the post was created.

Most states' attorneys general offices have had separate divisions with chiefs specializing in state and federal appellate works. Organizing the department with a separate solicitor general is a model that states are using in an attempt to promote the professionalism and quality of the work.  This strategy generally gives the attorney general more of a specialist who may be somewhat of a legal scholar on staff. Also, the solicitor is typically someone who was not involved in the attorney general's campaign and is thus someone who is more likely to offer a different perspective than other lawyers who are entrenched in the department.

List of Solicitors General 
The Solicitor General  was Benjamin M. Flowers.
The following is a table of Ohio State Solicitors.

Notes 

 
Government of Ohio
Ohio law